The Symphony No. 2 is a four-movement orchestral composition by the Finnish composer Uuno Klami, who wrote the piece from in 1945; it is the final of Klami's two numbered symphonies. Toivo Haapanen and the Helsinki Philharmonic Orchestra premiered the work at the Helsinki Conservatory on 15 December 1946.

Orchestration 
The Second Symphony is scored for the following instruments: ( Score)
Woodwind: piccolo, 3 flutes, 2 oboes, 2 clarinets, 2 bassoons, and contrabassoon
Brass: 4 horns, 4 trumpets, 3 trombones, and tuba
Percussion: timpani, bass drum, snare drum, and cymbals 
Strings: violins, violas, cellos, and double basses

Structure 

The Second Symphony is in four movements. They are as follows:

Discography 
The sortable table below lists the only commercially available recording of the Second Symphony:

References and sources

References

Sources 

 

Compositions by Uuno Klami
1945 compositions
20th-century symphonies